Goodenia turleyae is a species of flowering plant in the family Goodeniaceae and endemic to a restricted area of the south-west of Western Australia. It is an annual herb with spatula-shaped leaves in a rosette at the base of the plant, and yellow flowers.

Description
Flowering occurs from September to November.

Taxonomy and naming
Goodenia turleyae was first formally described in 2007 by Leigh William Sage and Kelly Anne Shepherd in the journal Nuytsia from material collected by Carol Turley in 2000. The specific epithet (turleyae) honours the collector of the type specimens.

Distribution and habitat
This goodenia is only known from three populations north of Esperance in the Mallee biogeographic region, where it grows in moist, sheltered locations near salt lakes.

Conservation status
Goddenia turleyae is classified as "Priority One" by the Government of Western Australia Department of Parks and Wildlife, meaning that it is known from only one or a few locations which are potentially at risk.

References

turleyae
Eudicots of Western Australia
Plants described in 2007
Taxa named by Kelly Anne Shepherd